Shraddha Shashidhar (born 3 September 1996) is an Indian beauty pageant winner who was crowned Miss Diva Universe 2017 and represented India at Miss Universe 2017.

She has modelled for brands like Nike, Yamaha Fascino etc. As her time at Miss Universe India 2017- she has travelled internationally as an Indian representative for promoting events in textile, tourism and real estate  in countries like Ghana, Thailand, Philippines etc.

Early life
Shraddha was born in Chennai, India. She did her schooling from Army Public School, Deolali, Nashik and enrolled in Sophia College for Women, Mumbai and has a degree in Mass media.

Pageantry

Miss Diva - 2017
Shraddha was crowned Yamaha Fascino Miss Diva Universe 2017 by the outgoing titleholder Yamaha Fascino Miss Diva Universe 2016, Roshmitha Harimurthy.

Miss Universe 2017
She represented India at Miss Universe 2017 which was held at The AXIS, Las Vegas, Nevada, United States on 26 November 2017, but was unplaced.

References

Femina Miss India
Miss Universe 2017 contestants
Indian beauty pageant winners
Female models from Chennai
Living people
1996 births
Sophia College for Women alumni